Lluqu Lluqu (Aymara for heart, also spelled Llokho Llokho) is a   mountain in the Bolivian Andes. It is located in the Potosí Department, Antonio Quijarro Province, Porco Municipality. Lluqu Lluqu lies between the Topala River and the Jatun Mayu (or Agua Castilla) northwest of Urqu Maki.

References 

Mountains of Potosí Department